The Play-offs of the 2003 Fed Cup Asia/Oceania Zone Group I were the final stages of the Group I Zonal Competition involving teams from Asia and Oceania. Those that qualified for this stage placed first and second in their respective pools.

The four teams were then paired up the team from a different placing of the other group for a play-off tie, with the winners being promoted to the World Group Play-offs.

Japan vs. Thailand

  advanced to the World Group Play-offs, where they were drawn against . They won 4–1, and plus qualified for the 2004 World Group.

China vs. Indonesia

  advanced to the World Group Play-offs, where they were drawn against . They lost 2–3, and were relegated to Group I for 2004.

See also
Fed Cup structure

References

External links
 Fed Cup website

2003 Fed Cup Asia/Oceania Zone